Club Deportivo Cayón is a Spanish football club based in Santa María de Cayón, in the autonomous community of Cantabria. Founded in 1915, it plays in Tercera División – Group 3, holding home games at Estadio Fernando Astobiza, which has a capacity of 2,700 spectators.

History 
In the 2017–18 season the club finished 6th in the Tercera División, Group 3. The following season CD Cayón improved its position by finishing 4th.

Season to season

1 season in Segunda División RFEF
39 seasons in Tercera División

References

External links
Futbolme team profile 

Football clubs in Cantabria
Association football clubs established in 1915
1915 establishments in Spain